"Every Time I Hear That Song" is a song recorded by American country music artist Blake Shelton for his tenth studio album, If I'm Honest (2016) and would be used for Shelton's other album Fully Loaded: God's Country. Released to radio as the album's fifth single on February 20, 2017, the track was written by Aimee Mayo, Chris Lindsey, Brad Warren and Brett Warren, while production was handled by Scott Hendricks.

Background and composition 
"Every Time I Hear That Song" was written by Aimee Mayo, Chris Lindsey, Brad Warren and Brett Warren, while production was handled by Scott Hendricks.  Blake Shelton performed the song at Universal Orlando for the Tonight Show Starring Jimmy Fallon on April 4, 2017.

Commercial performance
"Every Time I Hear That Song" reached No. 1 on the Country Airplay chart dated July 15, 2017, making this Shelton 24th No. 1 song on the chart.
The song has sold 146,000 copies in the United States as of July 2017.

Music video
The music video was directed by Kristin Barlowe in Nashville, and features Shelton singing in the rain.

Charts

Year-end charts

Certifications

References

2016 songs
2017 singles
Country ballads
2010s ballads
Blake Shelton songs
Songs written by Aimee Mayo
Songs written by Chris Lindsey
Songs written by the Warren Brothers
Warner Records Nashville singles